Nandamuri Harikrishna (2 September 1956 – 29 August 2018) was an Indian actor, producer, and politician. He served as the Member of Parliament in the Rajya Sabha, the upper house the Indian Parliament representing the Indian state of Andhra Pradesh from 2008 to 2013 and a member of the Andhra Pradesh Legislative Assembly from 1996-1999. His film works were predominantly in Telugu cinema. Harikrishna was the fourth son of actor and former chief minister of Andhra Pradesh, N. T. Rama Rao. His sons N. T. Rama Rao Jr. and Nandamuri Kalyan Ram are actors and daughter Nandamuri Venkata Suhasini is a politician.

Early life
Harikrishna was born on 2 September 1956 in Nimmakuru village of Krishna district in present-day Andhra Pradesh to N. T. Rama Rao and Basava Ramatarakam as their 4th son. He has eleven siblings: seven brothers and four sisters.

Acting career 
Harikrishna made his acting debut in 1964 as a child artist in Sri Krishnavataram, in which he played Krishna. It was directed by Kamalakara Kameshwara Rao. He then starred in Thalla? Pellama? (1970), followed by Tatamma Kala (1974), Ram Raheem (1974), and Daana Veera Soora Karna (1977). After a long sabbatical and political stint, he starred as a character actor in works such as Sri Ramulayya (1998), followed by a full-length role alongside Nagarjuna (actor) in Seetharama Raju (1999), Lahiri Lahiri Lahirilo (2002), and Seetayya (2003). In 2002, he received Nandi Award for Best Character Actor for his work in Lahiri Lahiri Lahirilo (2002).

Political career 
Harikrishna, who had a knack for driving, drove his father's "Chaitanya Ratham" (chariot of consciousness), a revamped and customised green Chevrolet with registration number ABR 7776 during his father's political campaignings. The vehicle was reportedly used to campaign over 75,000 kms and assumed mammoth significance in the state's politics. Outspoken and rebellious by nature, Harikrishna was instrumental in staging the 1995 coup that dethroned his father N. T. Rama Rao during Chief Ministership of N. T. Rama Rao alongside N. Chandrababu Naidu, Daggubati Venkateswara Rao and Nandamuri Balakrishna. He served as the member of Andhra Pradesh Legislative Assembly during 1996–1999 as the elected MLA from Hindupur Assembly constituency. He became a Cabinet Minister for Road Transport in 1996. In a historic move, he opened the doors for women in the State Road Transport Corporation. Hundreds of women were hired as bus conductors. However, following rifts with Naidu, he floated his own Anna Telugu Desam Party in 1999 but returned to his previous party in 2006 after the ATDP failed to win a single seat in the 1999 Andhra Pradesh Legislative Assembly election. He shared a bittersweet relationship with his brother-in-law Naidu, often expressing displeasure about his son N. T. Rama Rao Jr. being ignored for the party ranks. In 2008, he was a candidate of the Telugu Desam Party and was elected to Rajya Sabha. In 2013, he renounced his Rajya Sabha seat as a mark of protest against the then United Progressive Alliance government's decision to divide Andhra Pradesh.

Personal life

Harikrishna married Lakshmi Kumari on 22 February 1973 and they have two sons, Janaki Ram and Kalyan Ram, and a daughter, Suhasini. He has a third son, N. T. Rama Rao Jr., with Shalini Bhaskar Rao, a Kannadiga from Kundapur. Janaki Ram died in a road mishap, on 6 December 2014.

Death
Harikrishna died in a car crash in Nalgonda district, Narketpally, on 29 August 2018 at the age of 61. He was driving at a high speed without a seat belt on his way to the Nellore district of Andhra Pradesh to attend a private ceremony of his friend, accompanied by two others. His Toyota Fortuner crashed into a road median on Nalgonda district Highway near Narkatpally when he bent over to pick up a water bottle. His son Janaki Ram died on the same highway in 2014.

Nandamuri Janakiram was a Telugu movie producer under the N. T. R. Arts banner who also met a tragic death in a road crash while travelling alone from Vijayawada to Hyderabad. Reports say that, his car collided with a tractor near Akumpamala village in Munagala mandal of Nalgonda district. He was rushed to a private hospital in Kodad, where he died of internal bleeding.

Harikrishna was said to have had a liking for the number 2323. Ironically, Janaki Ram died driving a vehicle with registration number AP29BD2323, while Harikrishna died driving one with AP28BW2323. Coincidentally, Harikrishna's youngest son N. T. Rama Rao Jr. also had injured himself in a road accident on 27 March 2009 while returning from election campaigning for the Telugu Desam Party in 2009 Andhra Pradesh Legislative Assembly election in the same Nalgonda district. Harikrishna's own younger brother Nandamuri Ramakrishna too had survived two car accidents twice in the past.

Filmography

Awards
 He won Nandi Award for Best Character Actor - Lahiri Lahiri Lahirilo (2002)

References

External links

 

1956 births
2018 deaths
Telugu politicians
Indian male child actors
Rajya Sabha members from Andhra Pradesh
Indian male film actors
People from Krishna district
20th-century Indian male actors
Nandi Award winners
Telugu Desam Party politicians
Telugu male actors
Indian actor-politicians
Road incident deaths in India